Three ships of the Royal Navy have borne the name HMS Walrus after the marine mammal:

  was a W-class destroyer launched in 1917. She ran aground in 1938, was refloated and then broken up.
  was an aircraft transporter launched in 1945 and renamed HMS Skua in 1953. She was sold into mercantile service in 1962.
  was a Porpoise-class submarine launched in 1959, sold in 1987 and scrapped in 1991.

Royal Navy ship names